Lound Mill is a tower mill at Lound in the English county of Suffolk which has been converted to residential accommodation.

History

Lound Mill was built in 1837 by Robert Martin, the Beccles millwright replacing an earlier post mill. The mill worked by wind until 1939. The machinery was removed c1961 when the mill was converted to residential accommodation.

Description

Lound Mill is a four storey tower mill. It had a boat shaped cap with a gallery and was winded by a fantail. The four Patent sails drove three pairs of millstones.

References

External links
Windmill World webpage on Lound Mill.

Windmills in Suffolk
Tower mills in the United Kingdom
Windmills completed in 1837
Towers completed in 1837
Grinding mills in the United Kingdom
Waveney District